PK.COM.CN is a 2007 Chinese film directed by Xiao Jiang and starring Jaycee Chan, Bolin Chen, and Niu Mengmeng. The plot was adapted from an online novel, Lost in Time (在时), by He Xiaotian (何小天). in this film: Jaycee Chan and Bolin Chen reunite after starring in the Twin Effects II.

The film has an unusual style, incorporating music, dance, and art.  It was screened at the Hollywood China Film Festival in 2007 and at the 2008 Shanghai International Film Festival.

Plot 
PK.COM.CN tells the story of Zhang Wenli (Jaycee Chan), a young doctor with overbearing parents who is invited to a reunion of his medical school class. At the reunion he has flashbacks to his best friends from medical school - his popular and charismatic roommate, Ji Yinchuan (Bolin Chen), and a mysterious and rebellious girl, A Fei (Niu Mengmeng).

Cast 
 Jaycee Chan
 Bolin Chen
 Niu Mengmeng
 Zhang Bo
 Law Kar-ying
 Li Qinqin

External links
 Shanghai International Film Festival - Film Details
 That's Shanghai - Unbound: Rise of the Online Serial Novel 
 China Daily, "'The Case' Dazzles at Hollywood China Film Festival"

2007 films
2000s Mandarin-language films
Films based on Chinese novels
Chinese drama films
Chinese suspense films